Metzger (also Mezger) is a German/Yiddish (German-Jewish) occupational surname, meaning "butcher". Notable people with the name include:

Metzger
 Adam, Jack, and Ryan Metzger, members of American rock band AJR
 Alex Metzger (born 1973), German bobsledder
 Alex Metzger (footballer) (fl. 1979–1984), New Zealand footballer
 Arnold Metzger, German philosopher
 Bruce M. Metzger (1914–2007), American biblical scholar, Bible translator, and professor
 Butch Metzger (born 1952), American baseball pitcher
 David Metzger (born 1960), American orchestrator and composer
 Ed Metzger (born 1946), American actor and writer
 Erika Metzger (fl. 1927–1929), German table tennis player
 Georg Balthasar Metzger (1623–1687), German physician
 Gustav Metzger (1926–2017), German-born artist and political activist
 Heinz-Klaus Metzger (1932–2009), German music critic and theoretician
 Henri Metzger (1912–2007), French archaeologist and hellenist
 Jill Metzger (born 1973), American air force officer
 Kelly Metzger, (born 1980), Canadian voice actress
 Kurt Metzger (born 1977), American comedian, actor, and writer
 Matthew Metzger (born 1980), American actor
 Mike Metzger (born 1975), American freestyle motocross rider
 Otto Metzger (1885–1961), German-British engineer and inventor
 Radley Metzger (1929–2017), American filmmaker and film distributor
 Richard Metzger (born 1965), American television host and author
 Robert A. Metzger (born 1956), American electrical engineer and science fiction author
 Roger Metzger (born 1947), American baseball player
 Sol Metzger (1880–1932), American football coach and syndicated sports writer
 Thomas Metzger (sinologist) (born 1933), American scholar of Chinese politics and society
 Tom Metzger (1938-2020), American founder of the White Aryan Resistance
 William E. Metzger (1868–1933), American automotive pioneer, co-founder of E-M-F Company
 Wolfgang Metzger (1899–1979), German psychologist
 Yona Metzger (born 1953), Ashkenazi Chief Rabbi of Israel

Mezger
 Eduard Mezger (1807–1894), Bavarian architect and professor 
 Francis Mezger (1632–1701), Austrian Benedictine academic and writer
 Guy Mezger (born 1968), American martial artist
 Joseph Mezger (1635–1683), Austrian Benedictine
 Paul Mezger (1637–1702), Benedictine theologian and academic

In fiction
 Karl Metzger, a Nazi correctional officer in the HBO drama series Oz

Occupational surnames
Surnames
German-language surnames